HMCS Cormorant may refer to two ships that served in the Royal Canadian Navy and the Canadian Forces:

, a Bird-class patrol vessel launched in 1956 and paid off in 1963.
, a diving support vessel launched in 1965 as the trawler Aspa Quarto. Acquired by Canada in 1975, the ship served until 1997.

Royal Canadian Navy ship names